Metternich usually refers to Prince Klemens von Metternich (1773–1859), famous Austrian politician and diplomat.

It may also refer to any of several members of the House of Metternich.
 Tatiana von Metternich-Winneburg (1915–2006)

The surname is also shared by:

 Count Franz von Metternich (1746–1818), diplomat and father of Prince Klemens, first Prince of Ochsenhausen
 Germain Metternich (1811–1862), supported the revolutions of 1848 in Germany, joined the Union Army and was killed in 1862 by a drunken soldier
 Josef Metternich (1915–2005), German singer
 Lothar von Metternich (1551–1623), Archbishop-Elector of Trier and Prince-Abbot of prüm (1599–1623)
 Lothar Friedrich von Metternich-Burscheid (1617–1675), Prince-Bishop of Speyer (1652–1675), and Worms (1673–1675), as well as Archbishop-Elector of Mainz (1673–1675)
 Princess Pauline von Metternich (1836–1921), niece of Klemens and wife of Richard von Metternich
 Paul Wolff Metternich (1853–1934), German diplomat, ambassador to the British (1903–12) and Ottoman (1915–16) Empires
 Prince Richard von Metternich (1829–1895), diplomat, son of Prince Klemens von Metternich
 Count Franz von Wolff-Metternich (1893–1978) art historian, 1940–1942 chief of the Kunstschutz Service of the German Wehrmacht.

German-language surnames